Lego Fusion was a Lego theme that combined standard Lego bricks with a mobile app (for iOS and Android) that was designed to interact and communicate with the build models according to the principle of augmented reality. The theme was first introduced on 1 August 2014 and exclusively in North America only. It was eventually discontinued by the end of July 2015.

Overview
The Lego Fusion product line focuses on the combination of construction sets and game app to create the digital worlds with the smart-phones or tablets. This has been described by The Lego Group as "fluid play". Users create their own 2D models and scan by using an app named Lego Fusion. The product line includes Lego Fusion toy sets that each contain Lego bricks, Fusion capture plate and connect to the app. The toy sets are marketed at children aged 7 to 12 years old.

Development
Lego Fusion was developed by Lego Future Lab, Lego Fusion was invented as a way to marry digital and analog play. Lego Future Lab also used Qualcomm's Vuforia mobile vision platform for this process. Lego Future Lab senior design manager Ditte Bruun Pedersen explained, "To them, it's not two separate worlds. It's one world that blends together. It's all just play."

Lego Fusion used the combination of construction sets and scanning with a smart-phone or tablet to create digital worlds.

Construction sets
According to Bricklink, The Lego Group released a total of 4 Lego sets as part of Lego Fusion theme. The product line was eventually discontinued by the end of July 2015.

Lego Fusion was released on 1 August 2014 in North America. As part of the marketing campaign, the Lego Group released three Lego Fusion sets alongside the theme's associated app. The next month, Resort Designer (set number: 21208) alongside the theme's associated app was released on 1 September 2014.

Town Master
Town Master (set number: 21204) was released on 1 August 2014 and based on Lego City theme. The set consists of 258 pieces with a Fusion capture plate and one minifigure. It enables children to create 2D house models by placing bricks on the Fusion capture plate, scanning with the smartphone or tablet and playing with the Lego Fusion Town Master app to unlock their own game levels. The set included a Lego minifigure of Mayor. Lego Fusion Town Master app included the game levels of Lego City theme.

Battle Towers
Battle Towers (set number: 21205) was released on 1 August 2014 and based on Lego Castle theme. The set consists of 212 pieces with a Fusion capture plate. It enables children to create 2D tower models by placing bricks on the Fusion capture plate, scanning with the smartphone or tablet and playing with the Lego Fusion Battle Towers app to unlock their own game levels. Lego Fusion Battle Towers app included the game levels of Lego Castle theme.

Create and Race
Create and Race (set number: 21206) was released on 1 August 2014 and based on Lego Racers theme. The set consists of 223 pieces with a Fusion capture plate. It enables children to create 2D race car models by placing bricks on the Fusion capture plate, scanning with the smartphone or tablet and playing with the Lego Fusion Create and Race app to unlock their own game levels. Lego Fusion Create and Race app included the game levels of Lego Racers theme.

Resort Designer
Resort Designer (set number: 21208) was released on 1 September 2014 and based on Lego Friends theme. The set consists of 263 pieces with a Fusion capture plate and one mini-doll figure. It enables children to create a 2D house model by placing bricks on the Fusion capture plate, scanning with a smartphone or tablet and playing with the Lego Fusion Resort Designer app to unlock game levels. The set included a Lego mini-doll figure of Olivia. Lego Fusion Resort Designer app included the game levels of Lego Friends theme. The set was designed primarily for girls aged 7 to 12 years old.

App 
The 3 Lego Fusion apps were released on 13 August 2014 and Lego Fusion Resort Designer app was released on 1 September 2014. Each of the Lego Fusion apps was based on different Lego themes. Each of the Lego Fusion apps allows the user to select the game levels, build the construction set by place in a Fusion capture plate, scan the Fusion capture plate with the game app and play the game levels.

Reception 
In 2014, Will Greenwald of PCMag gave Town Master (set number: 21204) a 3.5 out of 5.

In 2015, Lego Fusion product line sold well and was listed as one of the 15 hottest Christmas toys by Toys "R" Us, describing it as, "at best a 1.0 version of a digital-physical play experience."

Awards and nominations 
In 2015, Lego Fusion was awarded "Toy of the Year" and also "E-Connected Toy" by the Toy Association.

See also
Lego City
Lego Castle
Lego Racers
Lego Friends
Lego Life of George
Lego Ultra Agents
Nexo Knights
Lego BrickHeadz
Lego Hidden Side
Lego Super Mario
Lego Vidiyo

References

External links 
 Official website

Lego themes
Products introduced in 2014
Products and services discontinued in 2015